PlanHub is an independent Canadian telecommunications company specializing in price comparaisons for cellular telephone plans, internet service provider plans and cable television pricing for the Canadian market. Created in 2013, this tool allows users to compare pricing of various Canadian operators based on their needs.

In 2019 PlanHub partnered with Protégez-Vous, a non-profit organization similar to Consumer Reports that offers consumer advice to francophones in Québec and Canada, to offer its phone and internet package comparaison via the magazine's website.

PlanHub has been featured on several francophone television programmes in Canada such as on Radio-Canada's La Facture where the founders met with Canadian consumers how PlanHub comparers internet, cellular and cable costs. PlanHub also was featured on a Télé-Québec show, Ça vaut le coût.

History 
PlanHub was launched in Montreal, Canada in 2013, under a different name Celagora, with the initial goal of allowing comparison of cell phone plans offered in each Canadian province, based on consumer preferences. Ultimately, to help consumers lower their cellular plan bills.

In August 2014 the company changes its name, Celagora becomes PlanHub.

n 2018, the search tool expanded to include comparisons of internet packages offered in Canada., In 2021, a TV package comparison tool is scheduled to appear on the platform.

The Canadian company currently compares over 50,000 plan combinations from over 90 providers and over 5,000 consumer reviews of Canadian phone and internet carriers.

With Bell's acquisition of Quebec internet provider, EBox, PlanHub became a heavily used tool to find comparable prices with other internet providers.

Notes and references 

Cable and DBS companies of Canada
Internet service providers of Canada
Companies based in Montreal
Mobile phone companies of Canada